Every Little Teardrop may refer to:

"Every Little Teardrop", single by Gallagher and Lyle B. Gallagher, G. Lyle 1977
"Every Little Teardrop", Always (Gabrielle album)